The Royal Scottish Pipe Band Association (RSPBA) is an association aiming to oversee pipe band competition, and to promote and encourage the development of pipe band culture worldwidepipe band competition, and to promote and encourage the development of pipe band culture throughout the world. It was founded in 1930.

The RSPBA sets the rules and guidelines for pipe band contests in the United Kingdom, administers the events including coordinating adjudication, logistics, and evaluation, and holds Annual General Meetings to ensure that the rules and regulations are up to date. In addition, the RSPBA administers and coordinates the World Pipe Band Championships, held every August in Glasgow. In addition to "The World's", there are four other Major Contests - Scottish, British, European, and United Kingdom Championships. At Branch level, there are numerous contests held at Highland Games and any venue which raises the fund to hold a contest. Bands are placed in a Grade system - from Grade 4 up to Grade 1. Competitive standards are set and maintained by the Music Board, and each branch of the RSPBA may appoint two National Council members to represent their Branch Members at the national level.

Associated organizations

The RSPBA has many sister organizations throughout the world. Some of these organizations include:

RSPBA

 London & South of England Branch
 Lothian & Borders Branch 
 North East England Branch
 North West England Branch
 Northern Ireland Branch
 North of Scotland Branch
 Ayrshire Dumfries and Galloway branch

Australia

 Australian Pipe Band Association
 New South Wales Pipe Band Association

Canada

 Alberta Society of Pipers & Drummers
 Alliance of North American Pipe Band Associations
 Atlantic Canada Pipe Band Association
 Piper's And Pipe Band Society of Ontario
 Prairie Pipe Band Association of Manitoba
 Saskatchewan Pipe Band Association
 British Columbia Piper's Association

Ireland

 Irish Pipe Band Association

Germany

 Bagpipe Association of Germany

Netherlands

 Netherlands Pipe Band Association

New Zealand

 Royal New Zealand Pipe Bands' Association

Scandinavia
 The Pipe Band Association of Scandinavia

South Africa
 Pipe Band Association of South Africa

Switzerland
 Pipe Band Association of Switzerland

United States
 Alliance of North American Pipe Band Associations
 Eastern United States Pipe Band Association
 Midwest Pipe Band Association
 Southern United States Pipe Band Association
 Western United States Pipe Band Association

External links
 

 
Pipe band associations
Musical groups established in 1930
Music organisations based in Scotland
1930 establishments in Scotland
Organisations based in Scotland with royal patronage